The Seoul Open Women's Challenger was a new addition to the ITF Women's Circuit.

Misaki Doi won the inaugural tournament, defeating Misa Eguchi in the final, 6–1, 7–6(7–3).

Seeds

Main draw

Finals

Top half

Bottom half

References 
 Main draw

Seoul Open Women's Challenger - Singles